Dacre Calder Stoker (born August 23, 1958) is a Canadian-American author, sportsman and filmmaker.

Biography
Stoker was born in Montreal, Quebec. He is the great-grandnephew of Irish author Bram Stoker, the author of the 1897 Gothic novel Dracula. He lived in his childhood in Montreal, Quebec and attended the Bishop's College School. He taught for several years at Appleby College.

Stoker is a former member of the Canadian men's pentathlon team. He coached the team at the 1988 Summer Olympics in Seoul, South Korea.

Because of the Stokers' frustrating history with Draculas copyright, Dacre, with encouragement from screenwriter Ian Holt, decided to write "a sequel that bore the Stoker name" to "reestablish creative control over" the original novel. In 2009, Dracula the Un-dead was released, written by Dacre Stoker and Ian Holt. Both writers claim to have "based [their work] on Bram Stoker's own handwritten notes for characters and plot threads excised from the original edition" along with their own research for the sequel, though the plot and characters often directly contradict the original novel. This also marked Dacre Stoker's writing debut.<ref>[http://www.draculatheundead.com/stoker-book-overview.htm Dracula: The Undead'''s overview]</ref> Winnipeg Free Press reviewer Kenneth MacKendrick called it "tempting enough to read and bad enough to be controversial, striking a balance between sensationalism and mediocrity".

Stoker contributed to Dracula in Visual Media: Film, Television, Comic Book and Electronic Game Appearances, 1921–2010, along with Caroline Joan Picart, David J. Skal, J. Gordon Melton and John Edgar Browning.

Stoker directed, produced and wrote the 2011 documentary film Dracula meets Stoker.

In 2016, Stoker, with his colleague Hans C. De Roos, was working on a Bram Stoker Dracula travel guide which will identify real-life locations mentioned in Stoker's novel as well as highlight the places Bram grew up in.

In 2018, he released Dracul, a prequel to Dracula which he wrote alongside J. D. Barker. Paramount has purchased the rights for the movie. Director Andy Muschietti, It'' producers Barbara Muschietti and Roy Lee have been hired to work on it.

Personal life 
His wife, Jenne Stoker, and their two children live in Aiken, South Carolina, where he is the executive director of the Aiken Land Conservancy.

Bibliography 

 2009, Dracula: The Un-Dead 
 2018, Dracul (co-author with J.D. Barker) 
 2021, The Virgin's Embrace: A thrilling adaptation of a story originally written by Bram Stoker (Stokerverse) 
 2021, Dracula's Bedlam (StokerVerse Book 2)

References

External links 

 
 

1958 births
Living people
Canadian horror writers
Bishop's College School alumni
Canadian pentathletes
Canadian people of Irish descent
People from Aiken, South Carolina
Athletes from Montreal
Writers from Montreal
Canadian male novelists
Bram Stoker